The Zanzottera MZ 34 and MZ 35 are a family of single-cylinder, two-stroke, single ignition aircraft engines designed for powered paragliders, one and  two place powered parachutes, single place ultralight trikes, light single place ultralight aircraft and motor gliders.

The engine was originally designed and produced by Zanzottera Technologies of Italy, but the design was sold, along with the rest of the company's two-stroke ultralight aircraft engine line to Compact Radial Engines of Surrey, British Columbia, Canada. Compact Radial Engines was then in turn acquired by Fiate Aviation Co., Ltd. of Hefei, Anhui, China in August 2017.

Development
The MZ 34 and 35 both have a cylinder barrel that is Nikasil-coated. The engine features a decompression channel to allow easier recoil starting, a tuned exhaust system and a belt-type reduction drive. Starting options include a recoil or electric starter.

Reduction ratios available are 1.84, 2.05, 2.14, 2.24 and 2.34 to 1.

The owners manual acknowledges the limitations inherent in the design of the engine, stating:

Variants
MZ 34
Single cylinder, two stroke single ignition aircraft engine optimized for powered paragliders, one and  two place powered parachutes, single place ultralight trikes, light single place ultralight aircraft
MZ 35
Single cylinder, two stroke single ignition aircraft engine with a narrower profile, optimized for motor-gliders

Applications

Specifications (MZ 34)

See also

References

External links

Compact Radial Engines aircraft engines
Zanzottera aircraft engines
Air-cooled aircraft piston engines
Two-stroke aircraft piston engines